The Bermuda National Athletics Association (BNAA) is the governing body for the sport of athletics in Bermuda.  Current president is Dr. Freddie Evans.  He was elected for the first time in 2021.

History 

BNAA was founded in 1946 as Bermuda Track & Field Association (BTFA) and was affiliated to the IAAF in 1974.  In 2012, the name was changed to Bermuda National Athletics Association (BNAA).

Affiliations 
BNAA is the national member federation for Bermuda in the following international organisations:
International Association of Athletics Federations (IAAF)
North American, Central American and Caribbean Athletic Association (NACAC)
Association of Panamerican Athletics (APA)
Central American and Caribbean Athletic Confederation (CACAC)
Moreover, it is part of the following national organisations:
Bermuda Olympic Association (BOA)

Members 
BNAA comprises eight Affiliated Clubs.

National records 
BNAA maintains the Bermudian records in athletics.

References

External links 
 

Bermuda
Athletics
Athletics in Bermuda
1946 establishments in Bermuda
Sports organizations established in 1946
National governing bodies for athletics